Dang Ye-Seo (Hangul: 당예서, Hanja: 唐汭序; ; born April 27, 1981 in Changchun, Jilin, China and originally known as Tang Na 唐娜) is a naturalized South Korean table tennis player. She was part of the table tennis team that won a bronze medal at the 2008 Summer Olympics, and part of the team that won a bronze medal at the 2012 World Team Championships.

References

External links
Athlete bio at 2008 Olympics site

1981 births
Living people
Olympic bronze medalists for South Korea
Olympic table tennis players of South Korea
Sportspeople from Changchun
South Korean female table tennis players
Table tennis players at the 2008 Summer Olympics
Table tennis players at the 2012 Summer Olympics
Naturalized citizens of South Korea
Chinese emigrants to South Korea
Olympic medalists in table tennis
Medalists at the 2008 Summer Olympics
Table tennis players from Jilin
Naturalised table tennis players
World Table Tennis Championships medalists